Adeaze are a New Zealand R&B/soul duo comprising brothers Nainz and Viiz Tupai. The group's debut album, Always and for Real, was released in 2004 and topped the album chart in New Zealand.

History
Brought up playing music in the church, the brothers used the time wisely crafting their skills with different instruments and live performance. Their passion for music continued and Adeaze performed eagerly at various church and school functions, during their adolescent years. The brothers attended Mangere College in Auckland New Zealand with a quick stint at Otahuhu College. In 1999 the brothers attended Excel School of Performing Arts and received Diplomas in Performance graduating at the top of the class, followed by a national tour of New Zealand with the students of Excel. The same year Adeaze caught the attention of Brotha D from Dawn Raid, who recognising the talent got the duo to record two songs for the upcoming compilation Southside Story (Dawn Raids Debut Album).

The duo released their debut album Always and for Real in 2004, which includes the number-one hit "Getting Stronger", their cover version of Bee Gees's song "How Deep Is Your Love", and "A Life with You"—which is sampled for Mariah Carey's "Your Girl" from the 2005 album, The Emancipation of Mimi. The album reached the number one position on the New Zealand album charts in 2004.

Then the duo released the second album, Rise and Shine, in 2011.

In a May 2008 Rip It Up interview, Former New Zealand Prime Minister Helen Clark stated Adeaze were her favourite New Zealand music group.

Discography

Studio albums

Singles

References

Further reading
Jewell, Stephen. "Adeaze". New Zealand Musician Magazine. Retrieved 20 October 2006.

External links
Dawn Raid Entertainment profile
Music.net.nz biography

APRA Award winners
Dawn Raid Entertainment
New Zealand contemporary R&B musical groups
Pacific Music Award-winning artists